It's Your Move is an American sitcom television series created by Ron Leavitt and Michael G. Moye, starring Jason Bateman, Tricia Cast, Caren Kaye, Ernie Sabella, David Garrison, and Garrett Morris. The show originally aired on NBC from September 26, 1984 to February 23, 1985.

Premise
The show centered on Matthew Burton (Bateman), a teenage scam artist who lived in a Van Nuys, California, apartment with his older sister Julie (Cast) and widowed mother Eileen (Kaye). Matt ran various underhanded dealings with his high school friends, especially his sidekick Eli (Adam Sadowsky), such as selling pre-written term papers and exam answer keys, and even engaging in blackmail.

The status quo of Matthew's world changed forever in the series' pilot, when Norman Lamb (Garrison) moved into the apartment across the hall. A quick-witted but impoverished writer from Chicago, Norman struck up a friendship with Eileen and the two were soon dating. Dismayed that his mother had chosen someone he felt was beneath her, Matt attempted to sabotage their relationship, but soon finds Norman to be a cagey antagonist who regularly foils Matthew's plots.

Cast
Jason Bateman as Matthew Burton
Caren Kaye as Eileen Burton 
Tricia Cast as Julie Burton
Ernie Sabella as Lou Donatelli
David Garrison as Norman Lamb

"The Dregs of Humanity" episode
A notable episode was a two-parter entitled "The Dregs of Humanity".  In the first half of the episode, Eli loses the school's money that had been trusted to Matt for hiring a band for a school dance.  To cover the loss, Matthew crafts the rise and fall of a band (The Dregs of Humanity) and acts as their manager.  The fictitious band, which actually consisted of four skeletons stolen from the biology lab (and controlled by strings with a smoke machine to cover them up), is a little too successful and Matthew soon finds himself agreeing to allow Norman an interview with the band for Music Press magazine, figuring that if the truth ever comes out, Norman will be humiliated. The interview only fuels the Dregs' popularity, and this sets up the cliffhanger:  the Palladium calls and offers a $20,000 gig for the Dregs.  While heretofore willing to let the Dregs retire, the money is too enticing and Matt agrees to the gig.

The second installment of the two part episode was scheduled to air the following week, but was preempted by a speech by then-President Reagan.

In the second part of the episode, Matthew is scrambling to explain why The Dregs failed to show up to a sold-out concert. To make matters worse, Norman is starting to suspect that the band doesn't exist and Matthew gets sued. He finally has the brilliant idea to send the "band" to a watery grave by concocting a story that the "band" drove off a cliff into the ocean. In a later episode, it is revealed that the fake band was inducted into the Rock and Roll Hall of Fame.

Series changes and cancellation
The series opened with some positive reception from critics, but its time slot competed with the popular show Dynasty on ABC and the series was canceled in early 1985.

In episode 14, "Caught in the Act," Matthew renounced his scheming after Eileen found out what he had been up to.  For the last four episodes, the show's original premise was completely ignored; this may have been a result of letters that NBC received from parents of high school-aged boys. According to Bateman, the reason the show was cancelled was because NBC was receiving “letters from mothers across the country whose kids were getting into trouble at school by mimicking Matthew’s (Bateman) antics”.

Production notes
The show's creators and executive producers were Michael G. Moye and Ron Leavitt, who just 3 years later would take the harder tone of the It's Your Move concept and put it in an entirely different context: Fox's Married... with Children, in which Garrison starred for four seasons (the two shows also shared the same production company, Embassy Communications).

Guest stars
 Kristy Swanson ("Love Letters")
 River Phoenix ("Pilot")
 Justine Bateman ("Pajama Party")
 Alan Blumenfeld ("Dad and Me")
 Shawnee Smith (“The Experts”)
 Liz Sheridan (“A Woman is Just a Woman”)
 Nina Blackwood (“The Dregs of Humanity: Part 2”)

Episodes

Award nominations

Syndication
The show was rerun on the USA Network from 1989 to 1992.

References

External links

1984 American television series debuts
1985 American television series endings
1980s American teen sitcoms
English-language television shows
NBC original programming
Television series about families
Television series about teenagers
Television series by Sony Pictures Television
Television shows set in Los Angeles
Television series created by Ron Leavitt